V. Sathiamoorthy is an Indian politician and former Member of the Legislative Assembly of Tamil Nadu. He was elected to the Tamil Nadu legislative assembly as an All India Anna Dravida Munnetra Kazhagam candidate from Kadaladi constituency in  1991 election.

References 

Dravida Munnetra Kazhagam politicians
Living people
India MPs 1998–1999
Lok Sabha members from Tamil Nadu
People from Ramanathapuram district
Year of birth missing (living people)
Tamil Nadu MLAs 1991–1996